Phyllocnistis maxberryi is a moth of the family Gracillariidae. It is known only from Costa Rica. It has been found on altitudes between 1,950 and 3,100 m in the Heredia Province, the Central Conservation Area and the Cartago Province, Cerro de la Muerte, Villa Mills, in Cordillera de Talamanca.

The length of the forewings is 2.2-3.7 mm.

The larvae feed on Gaiadendron punctatum.

External links
 Systematics, host plants, and life histories of three new Phyllocnistis species from the central highlands of Costa Rica (Lepidoptera, Gracillariidae, Phyllocnistinae)

Phyllocnistis
Endemic fauna of Costa Rica